Slave Songs of the United States was a collection of African American music consisting of 136 songs. Published in 1867, it was the first, and most influential, collection of spirituals to be published. The collectors of the songs were Northern abolitionists William Francis Allen, Lucy McKim Garrison, and Charles Pickard Ware.  The group transcribed songs sung by the Gullah Geechee people of Saint Helena Island, South Carolina. It is a "milestone not just in African American music but in modern folk history". It is also the first published collection of African-American music of any kind.

The making of the book is described by Samuel Charters, with an emphasis on the role of Lucy McKim Garrison. A segment of History Detectives explored the book's history and significance.

Notable songs
Several notable and popular songs in the book include:
"Michael Row the Boat Ashore" (#31)
"Bosom of Abraham" (#94 as "Rock My Soul")
"Down in the River to Pray" (#104 as "The Good Old Way")

See also
"Nobody Knows the Trouble I've Seen"
Songs of the Underground Railroad
"Jimmy Crack Corn"
Port Royal Experiment
Port Royal Island
Saint Helena Island (South Carolina)
Coffin Point Plantation

References

Notes

External links
Full text on Internet Archive (1867 edition)
Full text on Internet Archive (1951 edition)
History Detectives segment (S6E11)
Remastered digital edition using LilyPond

1867 non-fiction books
1867 in music

Song books
Non-fiction books about American slavery
Pre-emancipation African-American history